The Chattanooga Mocs men's basketball team represents the University of Tennessee at Chattanooga in NCAA Division I men's competition.  On March 30, 2022, Dan Earl was hired as the new head coach. The Mocs have appeared in 12 NCAA tournaments, most recently in 2022.

History
The Mocs won the 1977 NCAA Men's Division II basketball tournament, while completing their transition from Division II to Division I. During the 1997 tournament they progressed to the Sweet Sixteen by defeating both Georgia and Illinois.  They eventually lost to Providence.

Postseason

NCAA Division I Tournament results
The Mocs have appeared in the NCAA Division I Tournament 12 times. Their combined record is 3–12.

NCAA Division II Tournament results
The Mocs have appeared in the NCAA Division II Tournament five times. Their combined record is 11–5 and they were National Champions in 1977.

NIT results
The Mocs have appeared in the National Invitation Tournament (NIT) four times. Their combined record is 3–4.

CIT results
The Mocs have appeared in the CollegeInsider.com Postseason Tournament (CIT) one time. Their record is 0–1.

References

External links